The Dongdaemun Design Plaza, abbreviated as DDP, is a major urban development landmark in Seoul, South Korea, designed by Zaha Hadid and Samoo, with a distinctively neofuturistic design characterized by the "powerful, curving forms of elongated structures." The landmark is the centerpiece of South Korea's fashion hub and popular tourist destination, Dongdaemun, featuring a walkable park on its roofs, large global exhibition spaces, futuristic retail stores, and restored parts of the Seoul fortress.

The DDP has been one of the main reasons for Seoul's designation as the World Design Capital in 2010. Construction started in 2009, and it was officially inaugurated on March 21, 2014. It is physically connected to Seoul Subway via Dongdaemun History & Culture Park Station on Line 2, 4, and 5.

Overview 
The Dongdaemun Design Plaza (DDP) was designed by British-Iraqi architect Zaha Hadid, winner of the 2004 Pritzker Prize, with the concept of "Metonymic Landscape." Metonymy refers to a method of describing a specific object indirectly, and Hadid integrated historical, cultural, urban, social, and economic aspects of Seoul deduced from this method in order to create a scene of the landscape. Designed as a cultural hub in the historical district of Seoul as well as Korea's largest fashion district, the DDP is composed of undulating surfaces that resemble the flow of liquid and allow flexibility in space. The state-of-the-art BIM  (Building Information Modeling), mega-truss (extra-large roof truss) system, and space frame system are the key features in terms of creating grand-scale spaces. According to Hadid, the fundamental features of her design were "transparency, porousness, and durability." Many ecological features, including a double-skin facade, solar panels, and a recycling water system, are included in the building.

The construction project for replacing Dongdaemun Stadium with a public park has been discussed in the media since 2000, and the city of Seoul established a basic master plan for alternating the function of Dongdaemun Stadium in 2005. Upon the advice of architects, and in order to secure a high-quality design for the new landmark of Seoul, the city invited architects in February 2007 to participate in a design competition. The city requested that the architects include a design plaza, underground spaces, a history park, and a culture park in the project, according to the guidelines. Zaha Hadid's Metonymic Landscape won the competition.

The exterior envelope of the DDP, a smooth and giant mushroom-like structure floating above ground level, is made of concrete, aluminum, steel, and stone. The interior of the building is finished with plaster reinforced with synthetic fiber, acoustic tiles, acrylic resin, stainless steel, and polished stone in the interior.

Main Programs 

The DDP has 3 underground levels, 4 above-ground levels, and a main building that is 280 meters long. The building is equipped with diverse public spaces, including exhibition hall, conference hall, design museum, the design lab, the academy hall, media center, seminar room, Dongdaemun History and Culture Park, the designer's lounge, and the design market. Diversity of spaces allows the DDP to provide the widest range of events spaces possible to help to bring fresh vigor and cultural vitality in the city.

The art hall works as a launching platform for the Korean creative and cultural industry and operates as a key space for conventions, trade shows, exhibitions, fashion shows, concerts, and performances. The museum hall consists of five sections and allows many artists to engage in the design industry and exchange their ideas. The design playground, Design Dulle-gil (trail), the design museum, the design exhibition hall, and the design rest area are located inside the museum hall.

The design lab operates as an incubator for budding product designers from inside and outside the country. The design market is a multipurpose space for cultural events and shopping, and it opens 24 hours a day to provide a public space for visitors and residents of Dongdaemun Market, the town that never sleeps.

In addition, the DDP has parking areas, dispensaries, a feeding room, a coatroom, a cafe, and other facilities that are operated and managed by the Seoul Design Foundation of the city of Seoul.

History 

Dongdaemun Stadium was the first modern stadium in Korea and was built during the Japanese Colonial Period to celebrate the wedding of the Japanese Prince. From 1925 until its demolition in 2007, various national sports and celebration events had been held. The stadium was abandoned after the Seoul Olympics in 1988 and had become a local market in front of the largest fashion hub in South Korea.

Demolition of Fortress Wall in the Dongdaemun District 
Around the district of Dongdaemun, Dongdaemun-gu, a fortress wall once existed to protect Hanyang (the capital of Chosun). However, the wall was damaged and destroyed by war and the rapid development and expansion of the city. The first demolition was conducted in 1889 for the construction of the trolley railway between two areas of Seoul, Seodaemun and Cheongnyangni. The wall in the vicinity of Dongdaemun was demolished in 1908 during the visit of the Japanese prince, and a wall connecting Dongdaemun and Gwanghwamun was destroyed to build Gyeongseong Sports Complex in order to celebrate the marriage of the Japanese prince during the Japanese Emperor Hirohito's reign in 1924. The construction of residential housing for citizens further destroyed the remaining walls, and a number of illegal construction projects after the Korean War accelerated the demolition process.

Hullyeondogam and Gyeongseong Sports Complex 
The construction of Gyeongseong Sports Complex in 1925, later known as Dongdaemun Stadium, resulted in further demolition of the wall and the buildings near the area. The first modern stadium was renamed the Seoul Sports Complex after Korea became independent. Later, the stadium became an important venue for various national events.  The complex was once more renamed the Dongdaemun Sports Complex, and its use decreased when the Jamsil Sports Complex was built in 1984 for the Seoul Olympics.

Formation and development of Dongdaemun commercial area 
The Dongdaemun commercial area developed in the latter part of the Chosun Dynasty when people started to create an autonomous marketplace around Baeogae. Another large-scale modern market, Gwangjang Market, was formed, and the district became a constellation of various markets and small businesses. In the 1960s, a large number of sewing factories were built near Pyenghwa Market, in Dongdaemun-gu, and the market soon became the largest shopping district for shopping. With the addition of Miliore, a shopping mall for fashion constructed in 1998, the area has become a new retail sphere where citizens and other visitors can buy the latest fashions at a reasonable price.

Dongdaemun History & Culture Park 
Dongdaemun History & Culture Park is located on the east side of the DDP. The park connects the round-shaped Downtown Green Field Corridor from Mt. Naksan to Mt. Namsan, and serves as a cultural space for exhibiting the historic and cultural assets of Seoul. Originally, Hadid designed this area as a design street that introduces the latest design trends, but, during the excavation and demolition process of Dongdaemun Stadium, which started in December 2007, various historical remains were found. The city of Seoul established an excavation and investigation team for a safe and detailed survey in the area. In June 2009, the city decided to preserve and exhibit the excavated remains and announced the construction of Dongdaemun History & Culture Park, which would serve as a venue for the exhibition of historical remains. The area of the park is 65,232 m2, and the fortress walls of Seoul and Igansumun, two outdoor exhibition spaces, Yigansumun Exhibition Hall, Dongdaemun History Museum 1396, Dongdaemun Stadium Memorial, and Gallery MUN are the key features and facilities in the park area.

The local fashion hub district and the residential area share the park at the center, which was previously separated by Jangchungdanro-ro. In addition, because of the improvement in pedestrian walking environment after the construction of the underground walking network, the park and building serve as a new cultural space that connects many parts of the downtown area of Seoul.

References

External links

Official Website
 Photographic series by Italian artist Emanuele Zamponi, developed on the Dongdaeum Design Plaza & Park and designers from Seoul
 Seoul Design Foundation
 Project Description by Zaha Hadid Architects
 Dongdaemun Design Plaza & Park, The Seoul Research Data Service
 Dongdaemun Design Plaza, Key Policies, Seoul Solution, 2014
 Dongdaemun Design Plaza Facebook Page

Buildings and structures in Seoul
Zaha Hadid buildings
Deconstructivism
Postmodern architecture
Neo-futurism architecture
Buildings and structures completed in 2014
2014 establishments in South Korea
Tourist attractions in Seoul
Esports venues in South Korea
Seoul Dynasty
Jung District, Seoul